Man from Reno may refer to:

 "Man from Reno" (song), a 1993 song by Goran Bregović and Scott Walker for the French film Toxic Affair
 Man from Reno (film), a 2014 American film directed by Dave Boyle